ζ-Carotene isomerase (Z-ISO, 15-cis-zeta-carotene isomerase) is an enzyme with systematic name 9,15,9'-tricis-zeta-carotene cis-trans-isomerase. This enzyme catalyses the following chemical reaction

 9,15,9'-tricis-zeta-carotene  9,9'-dicis-zeta-carotene

This enzyme is involved in carotenoid biosynthesis.

References

External links 
 

EC 5.2.1